"All Rise" is a song by English boy band Blue. It was released in 21 May 2001 as the lead single from their debut album of the same name. "All Rise" was co-written and produced by Norwegian production team StarGate, who went on to produce several of Blue's biggest hits from 2001 to 2003. The song contains elements from the theme from The Pinchcliffe Grand Prix (1975), composed by Bent Fabricius-Bjerre. StarGate had previously used the sample in their production of "Not for the Dough" (1999) by Norwegian hip hop group Multicyde.

"All Rise" became a hit worldwide, peaking at number four in the United Kingdom, number three in Australia, number one in New Zealand, and number 15 in Ireland. The single has received a platinum certification in the UK for sales and streams of over 600,000 units and also went gold in New Zealand. In Australia, the song received a platinum certification for sales exceeding 70,000 copies. The band performed the song during the first series of The Big Reunion in 2013.

Background
The song uses a courtroom as a metaphor for revealing evidence of a significant other doing the narrator wrong. When the time came to release Blue's debut single, their record company said that it wanted to bring out "All Rise", which surprised the band themselves. Duncan James stated that Blue thought this was "the weakest song that we did", but then discovered that the track they recorded in the studio had been transformed, with the use of a harmonica and an upped tempo. Antony Costa said that the production team "completely flipped" the song.

Music video
The music video was filmed on 30 March 2001 in an empty room. The band sit on stools and walk around while lights shine down on them.

Controversy
In 2007, Chinese vocal duo Phoenix Legend were accused of plagiarising "All Rise" for their hit song "On the Moon"/"Above the Moonlight", a claim disputed by the duo as the lyrics were written in 1999.

Track listings

UK and Australian CD single
 "All Rise"  – 3:43
 "All Rise"  – 4:12
 "All Rise"  – 5:11
 "All Rise"  – 3:50

UK cassette single and European CD single
 "All Rise"  – 3:43
 "All Rise"  – 4:12

Canadian CD single
 "All Rise"  – 3:43
 "All Rise"  – 3:33
 "All Rise"  – 4:12
 "All Rise"  – 5:11

Credits and personnel
Credits are taken from the All Rise album booklet.

Studios
 Recorded at mixed at StarGate Studios (Norway)
 Mastered at Sterling Sound (New York City) and Sony Music Studios (London, England)

Personnel

 StarGate – production
 Mikkel SE – writing, instruments
 Hallgeir Rustan – writing, instruments
 Tor Erik Hermansen – writing, instruments
 Simon Webbe – writing

 Daniel Stephens – writing
 Blue – vocals
 Tom Coyne – mastering
 John Davis – mastering

Charts

Weekly charts

Year-end charts

Certifications

Release history

References

2001 debut singles
2001 songs
Blue (English band) songs
Innocent Records singles
Music videos directed by Andy Morahan
Number-one singles in New Zealand
Songs about judges
Songs about infidelity
Song recordings produced by Stargate (record producers)
Songs involved in plagiarism controversies
Songs written by Hallgeir Rustan
Songs written by Mikkel Storleer Eriksen
Songs written by Simon Webbe
Songs written by Tor Erik Hermansen
Virgin Records singles